The All-Ireland Intermediate Ladies' Football Championship  is a knock-out competition in the game of Ladies' Gaelic football played by women in Ireland. The series of games are organised by  Ladies' Gaelic Football Association (Irish :Cumann Peil Gael na mBan)) and are played during the summer months with the All-Ireland Final being played on the last Sunday in September or the first Sunday in October in Croke Park, Dublin.

The winners of the competition are presented with the Mary Quinn Memorial Cup, the early years of which (1991-1996) were known as a Senior B championship. It was designated for weaker senior and stronger Junior teams.

Winners

Roll of honour

2017 Final

2019 Final

References

Outside Sources
 Ladies Gaelic Roll of Honour

 
All-Ireland inter-county football championships
All-Ireland
1991 establishments in Ireland